Syllepte lygropialis is a moth in the family Crambidae. It was described by West in 1931. It is found in the Philippines (Luzon).

The wingspan is about 50 mm. The forewings are buffy brown with a fuscous spot in the distal half of the cell, another on the discocellulars, and between these spots an opalescent patch. The postmedial fascia consists of a series of opalescent patches and lunules defined proximally by fuscous, obliquely incurved to vein 5, oblique to vein 2, incurved to the anal vein, oblique to the inner margin. The hindwings are buffy brown, with a large wedge-shaped, opalescent patch medially, wide at the costa and tapering to a point on the inner margin, fuscous on the proximal edge and the distal edge is crenulate, fuscous and bordered with lunules beyond.

References

Moths described in 1931
lygropialis
Moths of Asia